Vayudoot was a regional airline in India established on 20 January 1981 as a joint-venture between the two state-owned carriers, Indian Airlines and Air India. The airline was headquartered at New Delhi's Safdarjung Airport.
The airline was originally conceived to serve the Northeastern region of India. The regional hub for the Northeast Region was Calcutta (Kolkata), and the airline built up operations to close to 30 destinations in this challenging area. Many of the airfields saw the resumption civil flights and fixed-wing aircraft after a gap of many decades.

The airline consistently lost money since its formation due to low occupancy. The government, struggling to find a solution to Vayudoot's continuing financial problems, considered both closure and privatisation as options as the carrier's route and fleet structure made the operation unprofitable.

History
In the late 1970s, the Indian government and its two airlines became aware of the increasing number of potential air travellers in many small towns around the nation. Vayudoot was started to expand India's domestic air transport network on a very large scale, with a completely new network designed to feed Indian Airlines' network at state capitals and other big cities. Hence, all Vayudoot destinations (apart from its hubs) were completely new, not covered by existing Indian Airlines services.

Vayudoot began operations on 26 January 1981, India's Republic Day, in the remote north-east of the country, linking towns in states such as Assam, Manipur and Tripura. A journey such as one from Lilabari (North Lakhimpur) in Assam state to Ziro in the neighbouring state of Arunachal Pradesh could take a few days during inclement weather, braving hazards such as avalanches in the hills and flooding in lower lying areas. The flight, on the other hand was as short as 12 minutes, though weather could cause disruptions because this was flying where visual contact had to be maintained with the ground/terrain in the absence of reliable aids for navigation. The weather caused poor visibility on account of heavy rains and low clouds and/or fog and could at times result in waterlogged runways. Many runways were unpaved strips, and facilities at these airports were very limited.

Its first aircraft were two F27s leased from Indian Airlines and linked 20 destinations. To keep costs low, Vayudoot did not serve in-flight meals and contracted out its ground handling services to local agents at all smaller destinations. Vayudoot supplied basic ground-handling equipment to the agents and trained their staff. Vayudoot started with retired flight crew of Indian Airlines to fly the HS-748 and F27 aircraft. As Dornier 228 were bought or leased, new pilots were recruited. The same held for the core engineering team, which comprised almost all of ex-Indian Airlines engineers.

Vayudoot became a public company in February 1983, owned jointly by Indian Airlines and Air India. At this time, its load factors were less than 50 per cent. Vayudoot's first Dornier 228 began service in 1985 on the  Delhi-Raebareli-Lucknow route. A total of ten Dornier 228s were ordered by Vayudoot.

Subsequently, the services of Vayudoot were extended to other regions, charting 100 stations in the country earning the sobriquet "worlds fastest growing airline". Vayudoot quickly established hubs at Bombay (now Mumbai), Delhi, Madras (now Chennai), and Hyderabad. Sub-bases were, at some points of time, established at Bhopal in Madhya Pradesh and Guwahati in Assam. The lack of adequate traffic to sustain operations on all these routes adversely affected the company's financial performance. After a review, the number of stations on the operational network was brought down to 48 on 31 March 1991. Vayudoot was then focused on consolidating its operations and rationalising its fare structure rather than embark on large-scale expansion of its network. Its operations were again primarily restricted to the Northeastern region and other inaccessible areas.

Vayudoot also operated an Agro Aviation Division which was involved in aerial spraying operations, seeding and afforestation operations.

Vayudoot's financial performance continued to deteriorate which finally led to the dissolution of the company and merger of its assets into Indian Airlines in 1993. On 1 April 1997 its flight operations were transferred to Alliance Air, which is a newly formed subsidiary of Indian Airlines since 1996 and its employees were absorbed into Indian Airlines and Air India.

Night Air Mail Service 
In 1985, Vayudoot started operating the Inland Night Air Mail Service (NAMS), a domestic overnight airmail service for the Indian Postal Service. The facility of this Vayudoot airmail service was also extended to a private courier. Every night, flights from the major metropolitan cities of India converged upon Nagpur Airport in the centre of the country. Usually the routes were:
 Delhi-Jaipur-Nagpur
 Calcutta-Varanasi-Nagpur
 Bombay-Nagpur
 Madras-Hyderabad-Nagpur

Despite a successful run of over a year, the service was discontinued because of demanding nature of the operation. The unpressurized Dornier 228 was limited to an altitude of 10,000 ft. The aircraft was dependent on ground-based en route navigational facilities and these were few and far between on many of the legs. Flying exclusively at night and negotiating violent storms called Kal baisakhi, followed by the Monsoon and in the absence of Radio navigation aids it became advisable to discontinue the operation.

During the early 1990s, Vayudoot used leased aircraft from Royal Nepal Airlines and Ariana Afghan Airlines to run night metro flights between New Delhi, Bombay and Bangalore. Aircraft such as the Boeing 757 and Boeing 727 were used.

Destinations 
Vayudoot flew to over 100 destinations during its existence.

Andhra Pradesh
Cuddapah – Cuddapah Airport
Hyderabad – Begumpet Airport
Puttaparthi – Sri Sathya Sai Airport
Rajamahendravaram – Rajamahendravaram Airport
Ramagundam – Ramagundam Airport
Tirupati – Tirupati Airport
Vijayawada – Vijayawada Airport
Visakhapatnam – Visakhapatnam Airport
Warangal – Warangal Airport
Arunachal Pradesh
Along – Along Airport
Daporijo – Daporijo Airport
Pasighat – Pasighat Airport
Tezu– Tezu Airport
Ziro – Ziro Airport
Assam
Dibrugarh – Dibrugarh Airport
Guwahati – Lokpriya Gopinath Bordoloi International Airport
Jorhat – Jorhat Airport
North Lakhimpur – Lilabari Airport
Rupsi  –  Rupsi Airport
Silchar – Silchar Airport
Tezpur – Tezpur Airport
Daman and Diu
Diu – Diu Airport
Delhi
Indira Gandhi International Airport
Gujarat
Ahmedabad – Sardar Vallabhbhai Patel International Airport
Baroda – Civil Airport Harni
Jamnagar – Jamnagar Airport
Kandla – Kandla Airport
Keshod – Keshod Airport
Porbandar – Porbandar Airport
Rajkot – Rajkot Airport
Surat – Surat Airport
Haryana
Chandigarh – Chandigarh Airport
Hisar – Hisar Airport
Himachal Pradesh
Dharamsala – Gaggal Airport
Kullu – Bhuntar Airport
Shimla – Shimla Airport
Karnataka
Bangalore – HAL Airport
Belgaum – Belgaum Airport
Bellary – Bellary Airport
Mangalore – Mangalore Airport
Hubli – Hubli Airport
Hassan – Hassan Airport
Raichur – Raichur Airport
Mysore – Mysore Airport
Kerala
Calicut – Calicut Airport
Kochi – Willingdon Island Airport (now INS Garuda)
Trivandrum – Trivandrum Airport
Lakshadweep
Agatti – Agatti Aerodrome
Madhya Pradesh
Bhopal – Raja Bhoj Airport
Guna – Guna Airport
Gwalior – Gwalior Airport
Indore – Devi Ahilyabai Holkar Airport
Jabalpur – Jabalpur Airport
Khajuraho – Khajuraho Airport 
Rewa – Reva Airport
Satna – Satna Airport
Ujjain – Ujjain Airport
Bilaspur – Bilaspur (Chakarbhata) Airport
Raipur – Raipur (Mana) Airport
Maharashtra
Akola – Akola Airport
Aurangabad – Aurangabad Airport
Kolhapur – Kolhapur Airport
Mumbai – Chhatrapati Shivaji International Airport
Nagpur – Nagpur Airport
Nanded – Nanded Airport
Nashik – Gandhinagar Airport
Pune – Pune International Airport
Ratnagiri – Ratnagiri Airport
Solapur – Solapur Airport
Meghalaya
Shillong – Barapani Airport
Mizoram
Aizawl – Lengpui Airport
Odisha
Bhubaneswar– Bhubaneswar Airport
Jeypore– Jeypore Airport
Rourkela– Rourkela Airport
Puducherry
Puducherry – Puducherry Airport
Punjab
Amritsar – Amritsar airport
Bhatinda – Bathinda Airport
Ludhiana – Ludhiana Airport
Pathankot – Pathankot Airport
Rajasthan
Jaipur – Jaipur International Airport
Jaisalmer - Jaisalmer Airport
Tamil Nadu
Chennai – Chennai International Airport
Coimbatore – Coimbatore International Airport
Neyveli – Neyveli Airport 
Thanjavur – Thanjavur Air Force Station
Thoothukudi – Tuticorin Airport
Salem - Salem Airport
Madurai - Madurai Airport
Thiruchchirapalli - Tiruchirappalli International Airport
Vellore - Vellore Airport
Hosur - Hosur Aerodrome
Ulundurpettai - Ulundurpettai airport
Karaikudi - Chettinad airport
Kayatharu - kayathar airport
Cholavaram - Cholavaram airport
Sulur - Sulur airbase
Tambaram - Tambaram airbase
Arakkonam - Rajali airbase
Ramanathapuram - Parundu airbase
Tripura
Agartala – Agartala Airport
Uttarakhand
Dehra Dun – Jolly Grant Airport
Pantnagar – Pantnagar Airport
West Bengal
Cooch Behar – Cooch Behar Airport
Kolkata – Netaji Subhash Chandra Bose International Airport

Accident/Incidents 
The airline had four safety incidents during its operational history, including two crashes which resulted in a total of 45 fatalities.

22 September 1988 - A Dornier 228 (registered VT-EJT) crashed in Aurungabad and was written off due to a heavy landing. None of the passengers or crew were injured.
23 September 1988 - A Fokker F27 (registered VT-DMB) hit a high lift catering truck during taxi at Calcutta. The truck hit the left hand outer wing of the F27. Part of the wing and half of the aileron were cut away. The three catering truck occupants were seriously injured in the event. None of the 39 passengers or 4 crew were injured.
19 October 1988 - A Fokker F27 (registered VT-DMC) was on a scheduled flight from Silchar to Guwahati when it disappeared on approach to the airport.  The aircraft undershot the runway in inclement weather. All 31 passengers and 3 crew died in the crash.
23 September 1989 - A Dornier 228 (registered VT-EJF) was on a scheduled flight from Pune to Hyderabad when the aircraft entered a steep descent and crashed into the reservoir behind the Ujani Dam. Isolated thunderstorms with localised heavy rain were reported in the area. It is believed that the aircraft entered a microburst and stalled. The aircraft was said to be in a steep dive before it crashed into the reservoir. All 8 passengers and 3 crew died in the crash.

Fleet 

As of March 1991, Vayudoot's passenger services had a total fleet of 23 aircraft.
10 Dornier 228-201
8 H.S. 748 "Avro"
5 Fokker F27-100 "Friendship"
Its Agro Aviation Division had a fleet of one helicopter and sixteen aircraft.

References

External links 

Airline Timetable Images: Vayudoot, India

Defunct airlines of India
Airlines established in 1981
Airlines disestablished in 1997
Indian companies disestablished in 1997
Indian companies established in 1981
Companies based in Delhi
1981 establishments in Delhi